Ochtendung is a municipality in the district of Mayen-Koblenz in Rhineland-Palatinate, western Germany.

Geography 

Ochtendung lies between the A 48 and A 61 motorways and has designated junctions from both. The village lies on the Nette and is neighboured by the municipalities of Lonnig, Bassenheim, Plaidt, Kruft and Saffig. Up until a few years ago, the B 258 road started in Koblenz before running through Ochtendung and Mayen towards Belgium, passing the Nürburgring. The stretch between Koblenz and Mayen was regraded due to the proximity to the A 48 and has since been the L 98.

Municipal Division 

The districts Alsingerhof, Emmingerhof, Fressenhöfe Waldorferhof and Sackenheimerhöfe (previously a Bassenheim district) make up the municipality of Ochtendung.

Etymology 

The name of the village is derived from the word Thing or Ding (Ochtendung).
A 'Thing' was a governing assembly in Germanic societies.

Archeology 

The south east area of the Eifel region is a veritable treasure trove for archeologists. In 1997, Axel von Berg found the cranium of a Neanderthal along with three stone artefacts by the 'Wannerköpfe' volcano in 1997. The cranium belonged to an adult man (some 35 – 40 years old) and had been broken into three pieces due to the pressure of the Earth, but these were seamlessly put back together.

Dated at some 160,000 to 170,000 years old, the man belonged to the early Neanderthals. Especially interesting is the closeness of the bones to those of homo erectus and because, around the edge there appear to be traces of human handling. It can be guessed that they were adapted and used as tools or bowls. The cranium was quickly covered by sediment and has therefore been well preserved.

Politics 

The Gemeinderat (comparable to the town council in English) of Ochtendung consists of 22 council members, voted in after the local elections of 7 July 2009 and headed by the Ortsbürgermeister in a voluntary position, as per the custom in the state of Rhineland Palatinate for village municipalities. This position is similar to the position of a town mayor.

The allocation of seats after the election is as follows:

SPD 11 seats
CDU 7 seats
FWG1 2 seats
WG Ich tu's (I do it) 2 seats

Sights and Tourism 

 Wernerseck Castle
 Karmelenberg, a volcanic cinder cone
 Kulturhalle Ochtendung, used for holding special events
 Remains of the town wall
 Cycle and Sculpture Trail between Ochtendung and Polch

Famous residents 

Jakob Vogt (1902–1985) Weightlifter
Jürgen Weigt (born 1957) Brigadier in the German Army
Peter Peters (born 1962) Journalist and football Functionary
Kristin Silbereisen (born 1985) Table Tennis Player

Sources 

Human Evolution, 19,1 S. 1 - 8 (2004)
Terra Nostra, Schriften der GeoUnion Alfred-Wegener-Stiftung, 2006/2 (Kongresszeitschrift)
Dr. Axel von Berg's discovery (German Only)
Local Election Results 2009 (German Only)

References 

Mayen-Koblenz
Districts of the Rhine Province